Pyropteron umbrifera is a moth of the family Sesiidae. It is found in Greece.

The wingspan is 20–24 mm.

The larvae feed on Limonium sinuatum.

References

Moths described in 1870
Sesiidae
Moths of Europe
Taxa named by Otto Staudinger